The 1992 Birmingham Fire season was the second and final season for the franchise in the World League of American Football (WLAF). The team was led by head coach Chan Gailey in his second year, and played their home games at Legion Field in Birmingham, Alabama. They finished the season with a record of seven wins, three losses and one tie (7–3–1) and with a loss against the Orlando Thunder in the WLAF semifinals as a wild card.

After a preseason loss to London, the Fire lost their opening game on the road at Sacramento. They then rebounded and went unbeaten over their next four games with wins over San Antonio, Frankfurt and Sacramento in addition to the first tie in league history against London at Wembley Stadium. Birmingham then lost in their rematch at San Antonio before they completed the regular season with four consecutive victories over Barcelona, Montreal, Orlando and Ohio to clinch the final playoff spot. In the WLAF semifinals, the Fire lost to Orlando 45–7 to finish the season with an overall record of 7–3–1.

Offseason

Draft
In February 1992, the second WLAF Draft was held in Dallas, Texas. It was held over two days with rounds 1 through 14 on February 4 and rounds 15 through 29 on February 5. In addition to those players drafted, as part of their partnership with the National Football League (NFL), 101 NFL players were allocated to the WLAF. The players allocated to the Fire included: quarterbacks Shawn Moore from the Denver Broncos, and Greg Jones from the Detroit Lions; running backs Steve Avery from the Green Bay Packers and Brian Lattimore from the Indianapolis Colts; guard Joe Valerio from the Kansas City Chiefs and linebacker Kyle Freeman from the Los Angeles Raiders.

Preseason
The 1992 preseason featured a single game for each team. The winner of the game would then serve as the number two tiebreaker, behind results in head-to-head competition, for playoff position. For their preseason game, the Fire lost 14–13 to the defending World Bowl champion London Monarchs before 10,150 fans at Legion Field. In the game, Birmingham took a 13–0 lead late into the fourth quarter. The Fire scored on a pair of 32-yard Philip Doyle field goals and on a 29-yard touchdown pass from Mike Norseth to Willie Bouyer. With just over six minutes remaining in the game, Monarchs' back-up quarterback Fred McNair led London on two touchdown drives for the win. The touchdowns were scored on McNair touchdown passes of 77-yards to Sean Foster and two-yards to Greg Harrel.

Regular season

Schedule

Game summaries

Week 1: at Sacramento Surge

To open the 1992 season, the Fire were defeated by the Sacramento Surge before 17,920 fans at Hornet Stadium. After Birmingham opened the scoring with a 50-yard Philip Doyle field goal in the first quarter, Sacramento answered with a pair of second-quarter touchdowns to take a 13–3 halftime lead. The second quarter points came on a two-yard Mike Pringle run and on a 47-yard David Archer pass to Eddie Brown. The Surge extended their lead further to 20–3 early in the third on a 10-yard Archer pass to Carl Parker before Doyle scored the final points of the game with his 46-yard field goal later in the quarter. With the loss, the Fire began their season at 0–1.

Week 2: vs. San Antonio Riders

In their home opener, the Fire rebounded from their loss to Sacramento and defeated the San Antonio Riders 17–10. After the Riders took a 3–0 lead on a 22-yard Jim Gallery field goal in the first quarter, the Fire responded with 17 second quarter points that proved to be enough for the victory. In the quarter, Eugene Rowell scored on a seven-yard touchdown run, a 47-yard Philip Doyle field goal and on a 32-yard Arthur Hunter interception return. In the third quarter San Antonio scored on a four-yard Brad Goebel touchdown pass to George Searcy to make the final score 17–10. The Riders had an opportunity to tie the game in the final minute of the game, but the Goebel pass was intercepted by John Miller on the Fire six-yard line. With the victory, the Fire improved their record to 1–1.

Week 3: at Frankfurt Galaxy

At the Waldstadion in Frankfurt, the Fire earned their first all-time victory in Europe with their 17–7 win over the Galaxy. After a scoreless first quarter, Birmingham took a 14–0 halftime lead with a pair of second-quarter touchdowns. Both were scored by Elroy Harris with the first on a nine-yard pass from Mike Norseth and the second on a one-yard run. The Galaxy responded in the third quarter on a one-yard Tony Baker touchdown run to cut the Fire lead to 14–7. A late Philip Doyle field goal in the fourth provided for the final points of the game in the 17–7 Birmingham victory. The 33,857 in attendance was the second largest crowd to attend a Galaxy game at Waldstadion to that point in the history of the franchise. With the victory, the Fire improved their record to 2–1.

Week 4: at London Monarchs

At Wembley Stadium in London, the Fire battled the London Monarchs to a 17–17 tie, the first tie in the history of the WLAF. Birmingham took an early 7–0 lead after Mike Norseth scored on a two-yard run before the Monarchs scored 17 consecutive points to take a 17–7 lead into the fourth quarter. London points were scored on a two-yard Charlie Young touchdown run and 33-yard Phil Alexander field goal in the second quarter and a 35-yard Stan Gelbaugh touchdown pass to Bernard Ford in the third quarter.

In the fourth quarter, the Fire cut the London lead to 17–14 after Elroy Harris scored on a one-yard touchdown run. With less than three minutes remaining in the game, Gelbaugh threw an interception that set up the game-tying, 42-yard Doyle field goal with only 0:10 remaining in regulation to send the game into overtime. In the overtime period, London failed on a pair of opportunities to win the game. The first came when Alexander missed a 39-yard field goal wide right with only 0:12 remaining, and the second when Howard Feggins intercepted a Norseth pass and returned it to the Fire three-yard where he was tackled as time expired.

The tie remained as the only one in league history through the 2006 season when Berlin and Hamburg battled to a 17–17 tie. With the tie, the Fire's record moved to 2–1–1.

Week 5: vs. Sacramento Surge

In a rematch of their season opener, the Fire defeated the Sacramento Surge before 20,794 fans at Legion Field. After a scoreless first quarter, Birmingham scored a pair of Philip Doyle field goal from 38 and 52-yards and Sacramento scored on a 19-yard David Archer touchdown pass to Carl Parker for a Surge halftime lead of 7–6. In the third quarter, each team scored touchdowns to tie the game at 14–14 as they entered the fourth quarter. The Fire scored first on a ten-yard Mike Norseth pass to Jim Bell, followed by the Surge on a ten-yard Archer pass to Eddie Brown. Birmingham then closed the game with a pair of touchdowns first on a 56-yard Norseth pass to Eddie Britton and a one-yard Jim Bell run for the 28–14 win. With the victory, the Fire improved their record to 3–1–1.

Week 6: at San Antonio Riders

In a rematch of their week two matchup, the Fire lost to the San Antonio Riders before 13,590 fans at Bobcat Stadium. After Jim Bell scored on a one-yard run for the Fire in the first, the Riders responded with 17 second quarter points. Wayne Walker scored first on a 23-yard Mike Johnson touchdown pass, a 37-yard Jim Gallery field goal and on 22-yard Chris Oldham interception return. Birmingham responded late in the second with the final points of the game on an 84-yard fumble return for a touchdown by Tracy Sanders. In the second half, the Fire missed on three scoring opportunities after Elroy Harris fumbled on the Riders' three-yard line and Philip Doyle missed field goals of 35 and 45-yards. With the loss, the Fire moved their record to 3–2–1.

Week 7: vs. Barcelona Dragons

In a rematch of their previous season meeting in the playoffs, the Fire defeated the Barcelona Dragons at Legion Field. Birmingham took an early 3–0 lead on a 36-yard Philip Doyle field goal. In the second quarter, touchdowns were scored for the Fire by Tracy Sanders on a 70-yard interception return and for the Dragons on a 16-yard Tony Moss touchdown reception from Scott Erney for a 10–7 Birmingham lead at halftime. After a 20-yard Doyle field goal in the third, the Fire extended their lead to 19–7 in the fourth after Mike Norseth threw a 54-yard touchdown pass to Steve Avery. Although unable to take the lead, the Dragons then scored the final ten points of the game on a three-yard Tony Rice touchdown run and on a 38-yard Teddy Garcia field goal. With the victory, the Fire improved their record to 4–2–1.

Week 8: vs. Montreal Machine

With just under ten seconds remaining in overtime, Jim Bell scored on a one-yard touchdown run to give the Fire a 23–16 win over the Montreal Machine at Legion Field. After field goals were scored for the Machine by Björn Nittmo from 43-yards and for the Fire by Philip Doyle from 36-yards in the first quarter, a 16-yard Mike Norseth touchdown run in the second gave Birmingham a 10–3 halftime lead. Field goals of 21 and 23-yards by Doyle extended the Fire lead to 16–3 early in the fourth before the Machine tied the game with a pair of late touchdowns. Michael Proctor scored first on a six-yard run and then threw a 22-yard touchdown pass to Charlie Young to send the game into overtime.

With less than a minute remaining in the overtime period, Montreal did not punt on a fourth-and-three on their own 43-yard line. Michael Proctor was subsequently stopped at their own 45-yard line and turned the ball over on downs to Birmingham. On the next play, Mike Norseth threw a 44-yard pass to Willie Bouyer at the one-yard line and two plays later Jim Bell scored the game-winning touchdown on a one-yard run. With the victory, the Fire improved their record to 5–2–1.

Week 9: vs. Orlando Thunder

In the final home game of the season, Birmingham defeated the Orlando Thunder 24–23 at Legion Field. Birmingham took a 7–3 lead at the end of the first quarter after Tracy Bennett connected on a 42-yard field goal for the Thunder and Elroy Harris scored on a seven-yard touchdown run. The Fire extended their lead to 21–10 at halftime after touchdown runs of one-yard by Jim Bell and seven-yards by Harris before the Thunder scored their first touchdown on a one-yard Darryl Clack touchdown run. After a 90-yard Joe Johnson punt return brought the score to 21–17, Birmingham scored their final points on a 22-yard Philip Doyle field goal early in the fourth. The Thunder then scored on a three-yard Scott Mitchell touchdown pass to Grantis Bell; however, instead of tying the game with an extra point, the Thunder failed on a two-point conversion and the Fire won 24–23. With the victory, the Fire improved their record to 6–2–1.

Week 10: at Ohio Glory

In the final regular season game of the year, Birmingham defeated the Ohio Glory 27–24 at Ohio Stadium to clinch the final playoff spot as a wild card. After the first quarter, the Fire led 14–10 with Birmingham points scored on touchdown runs of one-yard by Elroy Harris and two-yards by Jim Bell and Ohio points scored on an eight-yard Greg Frey touchdown pass to Randy Bethel and a 42-yard Jerry Kauric field goals. The Glory then took a 24–17 halftime lead after a pair of Frey touchdowns, the first a 51-yard pass to Phil Logan and the second on a one-yard run. The Fire then shutout the Glory in the second half and scored on a two-yard Bell touchdown run in the third and on a 30-yard Philip Doyle field goal in the fourth to win 27–24. With the victory, the Fire improved their record to 7–2–1.

Postseason

Schedule

Game summary

WLAF Semifinal: at Orlando Thunder

Against the Orlando Thunder in the semifinals of the WLAF playoffs, the Fire lost 45–7 at the Florida Citrus Bowl to complete their season.

Staff

Final roster

Awards
After the completion of the regular season, the All-World League Team was selected by the league's ten head coaches. Overall, Birmingham had two players selected to the first team. The selections were:

John Brantley, Linebacker, 1st Team
John Miller, Free safety, 1st Team

References

Birmingham Fire seasons
1992 in sports in Alabama